Tommy Lynch may refer to:

 Tommy Lynch (rugby) (1927–2006), New Zealand rugby union and rugby league player
 Tommy Lynch (footballer) (born 1964), Irish footballer